Whizzer may refer to:


Fictional characters
Whizzer (comics), several characters in Marvel Comics publications:
Speed Demon (comics), formerly known as the Whizzer
Whizzer (Robert Frank), a superhero
Whizzer (Stanley Stewart), a member of the Squadron Supreme
Wizzer, a Dalmatian puppy in 101 Dalmatians
Whizzer Brown, from a trilogy of musicals that consists of In Trousers (1979), March of the Falsettos (1981) and Falsettoland (1990), the latter two of which were combined into the musical Falsettos (1992)
"Whizzer" Deaver, from the American TV series ALF

Nickname
Byron White (1917-2002), associate justice of the Supreme Court of the United States and football player
Wilford White (1928-2013), American National Football League player

Other uses
Whizzer, a part of Whizzer and Chips, a British comic
Whizzer (motorcycles), a line of bicycle engines produced in the United States from 1939 to 1965 and revived in 1997
Hamilton Whizzers, an ice hockey team
Watson's "Whizzers", a group of pilots, engineers and maintenance men assigned by the United States Army Air Forces to capture and evaluate German aeronautical technology during and after World War II
An overhook, a wrestling hold
Whizzer (roller coaster), two identical roller coasters at California's Great America (now defunct) and Six Flags Great America

See also
Wizzzer, a gyroscopic top from Mattel

Lists of people by nickname